Marius Stan  is a Romanian scientist and actor from Urziceni, currently a senior scientist at the Applied Materials division at Argonne National Laboratory in Lemont, Illinois, where he uses Artificial Intelligence to design materials. Stan is best known for playing car wash owner Bogdan Wolynetz in the AMC television series Breaking Bad.

Education 
In 1986, Stan earned a Bachelor of Science degree in physics from the University of Bucharest. In 1997, he earned a PhD in chemistry from the Institute of Physical Chemistry of the Romanian Academy.

Career 
Stan was a scientist at the Los Alamos National Laboratory in Los Alamos, New Mexico before moving on to the Argonne National Laboratory, a national research laboratory jointly operated by the University of Chicago and Department of Energy, in 2010. From 2013 to 2015, Stan served in the Office of Nuclear Energy within the United States Department of Energy. Stan is also a writer of short fiction and poetry.

Acting 
Stan was living in Albuquerque, New Mexico during the filming of the first season of AMC's Breaking Bad. His two children hoped to be extras in the series, so Stan sent the producers a family photo. Stan's wife and children were picked to be extras, but to Stan's surprise, the producers liked his look and wanted him for a speaking role: the owner of the car wash where Walter White works. The character of Bogdan Wolynetz and the scenes featuring him were further developed, and he would appear in four more episodes.

Filmography

Television

References

External links

Living people
Romanian scientists
Romanian male television actors
Place of birth missing (living people)
Year of birth missing (living people)
University of Bucharest alumni
Los Alamos National Laboratory personnel
Argonne National Laboratory people